Media-accelerated Global Information Carrier (MaGIC) is an audio over Ethernet protocol developed by Gibson Guitar Corporation in partnership with 3COM.  It allows bidirectional transmission of multichannel audio data, control data, and instrument power.

Revision 1.0 was introduced in 1999; the most current revision 3.0c was released in 2003.

MaGIC is used in several guitar products such as Gibson Digital Guitar.

Capabilities 
 Uses Category 5 UTP cables up to 100 m long
 Frame-compatible with Fast Ethernet
 32 channels, 192 kHz sampling rate
 32-bit integer audio
 32-bit floating point audio
 24-bit integer audio with 4-bit channel status and 4-bit channel command 
 32-bit raw data
 Supports line network topology, star topology, and a combination of the two

Network protocol 
In terms of ISO OSI model, MaGIC can use physical and link layer (MAC/LLC) based on 100 Mbit Fast Ethernet signalling specified in IEEE 802.3/IEEE 802.3af and IEEE 802.2, however MaGIC implements proprietary network and application layers which can be used with different physical layers such as Gigabit Ethernet or optical media.

The frame consists of 1776 bytes. The network protocol encapsulates each frame application data (1506 bytes) into media payload (1024 bytes) and control payload (352 bytes) fields of the frame. The media payload is reserved for low-latency synchronous audio and video data, and control payload may encapsulate MaGIC control messages, MIDI data, and other protocols.

Media streams are transmitted synchronously without re-sampling or buffering, ensuring minimal latency; each stream has one source and one or more destinations. Control messages are generally broadcast to the entire network  each device processes the destination address and forwards to all neighbors if necessary.

Application protocol 
A MaGIC device consists of the following logical entities: 
 Unit  an access point that sends and receives control messages;
 Components  access points for control applications such as power on/off switches, volume controls, control surfaces, or graphical user interfaces;
 Ports  represent either physical connections or user applications which send media to the network;
 Media slot routers  route media data streams through the network. 

Individual control capabilities of the device are exposed through the MaGIC Control Protocol (MCP), which allow communication with Components in other devices (a maximum of 65535 per device).

The network elects a System Timing Master (STM) which is the source of synchronization on for all devices. Timecode formats include MaGIC timecode and MIDI Time Code.

The control data in consist of 12-bit Control Message Code (CMC) 4-bit status field, 32-bit Source (Unit and Component, 16-bit each) and 32-bit Destination, and may contain up to 32 Kbytes of data in multiple frames. 

The CMCs are defined into four classes:
 Network Management Messages (0-127)
 Well Known Application Protocols (128-511)  used for encapsulation of well-known high-level protocols or for transporting messages with well-known format and structure (like MIDI).
 User Control Messages (512-1023) - proprietary user messages
 Reserved (1024-4095).

Control links are bi-directional communication pipes between several MaGIC devices, intended for control applications. For example, a control link allows the knob on one device to regulate the remotely located volume on another device through the MaGIC network. Control links allow remote management from a computer with a sophisticated GUI which would act as a network supervisor that would manage other applications. Devices may also establish control links using proprietary mechanisms as long as they are compliant with this specification.

References

External links
 

Audio network protocols
Ethernet